Charles William Hodde (July 30, 1906 – June 27, 1999) was an American politician in the state of Washington. He served in the Washington House of Representatives from 1937 to 1939 and from 1943 to 1953. He was Speaker of the House from 1949 to 1953.

References

1999 deaths
1906 births
Democratic Party members of the Washington House of Representatives
20th-century American politicians